Kalateh-ye Tut (also Romanized as Kalāteh-ye Tūt; also known as Tūt) is a village in Zangelanlu Rural District, Lotfabad District, Dargaz County, Razavi Khorasan Province, Iran. At the 2006 census, its population was 143, in 23 families.

References 

Populated places in Dargaz County